The Invictus Games is an international multi-sport event first held in 2014, for wounded, injured and sick servicemen and women, both serving and veterans. The word 'Invictus' means 'unconquered', chosen as an embodiment of the fighting spirit of the wounded, injured and sick service personnel and what they can achieve, post injury.

The Invictus Games were founded by Prince Harry, Duke of Sussex. The inspiration came from his visit to the Warrior Games in the United States, where he witnessed the ability of sport to help both psychologically and physically.

Launch
The Games were launched on 6 March 2014 by Prince Harry at London's Copper Box arena, used as a venue during the 2012 Olympics. Having seen a British team competing at the US Warrior Games held in Colorado in 2013, the prince wished to bring the concept of a similar international sporting event to the United Kingdom. With the backing of Mayor of London Boris Johnson, the London Organising Committee of the Olympic and Paralympic Games and the Ministry of Defence, the event was put together over ten months. £1m of funding for the project was provided by The Royal Foundation, a charity established by Prince Harry along with the Duke and Duchess of Cambridge, with an equal amount being pledged by Chancellor George Osborne from Treasury funds generated by fines imposed on banks as a result of the Libor scandal. The Games were also sponsored by Jaguar Land Rover. Speaking at the launch, the Prince said that the Games would "demonstrate the power of sport to inspire recovery, support rehabilitation and demonstrate life beyond disability". He also said that their long-term objective was to ensure that injured troops are not forgotten as Britain's involvement with the War in Afghanistan comes to an end.

Host cities

Invictus Games Foundation
The Invictus Games Foundation is the owner of the brand and the selector of future Host Cities. It is responsible for sport and competition management, rules, categorisations and branding.

The bidding process for future games started in November 2014.

Governance
The people who govern the foundation are:

Patron: The Duke of Sussex 
Chairman: Charles Allen, Baron Allen of Kensington

Trustees
Sir Keith Mills (formerly chairman)
Dave Henson (British Team Captain of the 2014 Invictus Games)
Debbie Jevans (formerly Director of Sport for the London 2012 Olympic and Paralympic Games; Organising committee member Invictus Games 2014)
Edward Lane Fox (former Private Secretary to Prince Harry)
Guy Monson (Trustee, The Royal Foundation of The Duke and Duchess of Cambridge and Prince Harry)
Paddy Nicoll (Trustee, HALO Trust; formerly Army, Row2Recovery and Invictus Games 2014)
Mary Reilly (also on the Board of the London Organising Committee of the Olympic Games and Paralympic Games, organising committee member of Invictus Games 2014)

Staff:
Chief Executive: Dominic Reid (was responsible for the operational delivery of the Invictus Games London 2014)
Operations Director: Richard Smith

Ambassador
Lewis Hamilton, a seven-time Formula One World Champion, was appointed as the first ambassador; he visited Tedworth House before the announcement. In July 2015, Lewis invited some Invictus Games athletes to the British Grand Prix.

History

2014 Invictus Games

The first Invictus Games were held on 10–14 September 2014. Around 300 competitors from 13 countries which have fought alongside the United Kingdom in recent military campaigns participated. Competitive events were held at many of the venues used during the 2012 Olympics, including the Copper Box and the Lee Valley Athletics Centre. The Games were broadcast by the BBC.

14 countries were invited to the 2014 games, 8 from Europe, 2 from Asia, 2 from North America and 2 from Oceania. No countries from Africa were invited. Teams from all the invited countries, except Iraq, took part.

The closing concert was broadcast on BBC Two, hosted by Clare Balding and Greg James. The concert was hosted by Nick Grimshaw and Fearne Cotton, with live performances from Foo Fighters, Kaiser Chiefs, James Blunt, Rizzle Kicks, Bryan Adams and Ellie Goulding.

2016 Invictus Games

On 14 July 2015, Prince Harry, Patron of Invictus Games Foundation, announced the 2016 Invictus Games would take place from 8–12 May 2016 at the ESPN Wide World of Sports Complex in Orlando, Florida.

On 28 October 2015, Prince Harry, USA's First Lady Michelle Obama and Second Lady Jill Biden launched Invictus Games 2016 at Fort Belvoir.

In order to bring Invictus Games to the US, Military Adaptive Sports Inc. (MASI) was created, and worked to build on the success of the Invictus Games 2014 held in London. Ken Fisher served as chairman and CEO for Invictus Games Orlando 2016.

All 14 countries from the 2014 Games were invited back, while Jordan was the only new invitee.

2017 Invictus Games

Toronto hosted the 2017 Invictus Games in September 2017 during Canada's sesquicentennial. Building from hosting the Pan American and Parapan American Games in 2015, Toronto's organizers planned to feature more competitors, nations and sports—such as ice events—than previously.

Unlike prior games which were hosted at a single site, multiple venues around the Greater Toronto Area hosted the 12 sporting events and opening and closing ceremonies.  The Air Canada Centre hosted the ceremonies. Fort York National Historic Site hosted the archery; Nathan Phillips Square hosted wheelchair tennis; Ryerson University's Mattamy Athletic Centre hosted the indoor rowing, powerlifting, sitting volleyball, wheelchair basketball and wheelchair rugby; St. George's Golf and Country Club hosted the golf; The Distillery District hosted the Jaguar Land Rover driving challenge; High Park hosted cycling; Toronto Pan Am Sports Centre hosted swimming, sitting volleyball and wheelchair basketball; and York Lions Stadium hosted the athletics.

Michael Burns was the CEO for the 2017 Games, and the official mascot for the Games was Vimy, a Labrador.

All 15 countries from the 2016 Games were invited back, with new invitations going to Romania and Ukraine.

2018 Invictus Games

Bids to host the 2018 Invictus Games closed in December 2015. The Gold Coast in Australia announced its intention to bid, using facilities built for the 2018 Commonwealth Games. In November 2016, Sydney, Australia, was announced as the host city.

Patrick Kidd was the CEO. The Royal Australian Mint released a commemorative $1 coin featuring Braille text in the lead-up to the Games.

All 17 countries from the 2017 Games were invited back, with an invitation extended to Poland.

2020 Invictus Games

The games were to be held on 9–16 May 2020 at the Zuiderpark Stadion in The Hague, Netherlands, but were postponed to 2021 due to the COVID-19 pandemic. They were then postponed again to the Spring of 2022. The new dates were 16 April to 22 April 2022.

In April 2021, it was announced that Heart of Invictus, a Netflix documentary series in partnership with Invictus Games and Archewell, would surround the competitors from the 2022 Invictus Games. Prince Harry would executive produce the series and appear on camera. The funding from the documentary series would go to the Invictus Games Foundation, and their work supporting international wounded, injured and sick service personnel and veterans.

2023 Invictus Games
Games were to be held in 2022 in Düsseldorf, Germany, in the Merkur Spiel-Arena.  Following the postponement of the 2020 Games to 2022, the Düsseldorf Games have now been postponed to 2023.

2025 Invictus Games
On 22 April 2022, Prince Harry announced that the 2025 games will take place in Vancouver and Whistler, Canada. It is planned to be the first games to feature winter adaptive sports, including alpine skiing, Nordic skiing, skeleton and wheelchair curling. The bid to host the games was submitted by True Patriot Love Foundation, in partnership with the Government of Canada, the province of British Columbia and the two Canadian municipalities and in partnership with the local Lil'wat, Musqueam, Squamish, and Tsleil-Waututh indigenous nations.

See also

Help for Heroes
IWAS World Games
Military sports
Military World Games

References

External links

 
 2014 games
 2016 games
 2017 games
 2018 games
 2022 games
 2023 games

 
Disabled multi-sport events
Military sports competitions
Prince Harry, Duke of Sussex
Recurring sporting events established in 2014
2014 establishments in the United Kingdom
NATO